Ratansinh Rajda (19 December 1927 – 10 April 1998) was an Indian politician. He was member of the 6th and 7th Lok Sabha. He represented the Mumbai South constituency and was a member of the Janata Party.

Life and career 
He was born on December 19, 1927 at Khambhalia in Jamnagar district of Gujrat. He attended St. Xavier's College and Government Law College in Bombay. In 1954, he married Hansaben Rajda. The couple had two daughters. He participated in various freedom struggles before 1947.

During Emergency, he was arrested under Maintenance of Internal Security Act (MISA) and spent 19 months in jail. In 1977, he joined Janata Party and was elected from Mumbai South constituency to 6th Lok Sabha. He was re-elected to 7th Lok Sabha from Mumbai South.

Positions held 

 1947–1948 General Secretary, Bombay Student Congress.
 1971–1974 General Secretary, Bombay Pradesh Congress Committee (Organisation).
 1974 Chairman, Works Committee, Bombay Municipal Corporation.
 1977–1979 Member, 6th Lok Sabha.
 1977–1978 Secretary, Janata Party Bombay.
 1979 Member, Public accounts committee of Parliament.
 1980–1984 Member, 7th Lok Sabha (2nd term).
 1980 Member, Committee on Subordinate Legislation of Parliament.

References

India MPs 1977–1979
Janata Party politicians
Lok Sabha members from Maharashtra
Politicians from Mumbai
India MPs 1980–1984
1927 births
1998 deaths
Indian National Congress politicians
Indian National Congress politicians from Maharashtra